Khar Kesh (also Romanized as Khār Kesh and Khārkash) is a village in Miandorud-e Kuchak Rural District, in the Central District of Sari County, Mazandaran Province, Iran. According to the 2006 census, its population was 1,144, in 301 families.

References 

Populated places in Sari County